Wellington is a home rule-class city in metro Louisville, Jefferson County, Kentucky, United States. It is considered to be part of the Upper Highlands section of Louisville. It was incorporated in 1946. The population was 565 at the 2010 census.

Geography
Wellington is located in central Jefferson County at  (38.216770, -85.670038). It is surrounded by the city of Louisville. U.S. Route 150 (Bardstown Road) forms the southwest border of the community.

Demographics

At the 2000 census there were 561 people in 246 households, including 167 families, in the city. The racial makeup of the city was 97.15% White, 1.43% African American, 0.18% Native American, 0.36% Asian, 0.18% Pacific Islander, 0.36% from other races, and 0.36% from two or more races. Hispanic or Latino of any race were 2.67%.

Of the 246 households 23.6% had children under the age of 18 living with them, 56.9% were married couples living together, 8.9% had a female householder with no husband present, and 32.1% were non-families. 28.5% of households were one person and 13.0% were one person aged 65 or older. The average household size was 2.28 and the average family size was 2.77.

The age distribution was 20.7% under the age of 18, 3.4% from 18 to 24, 29.9% from 25 to 44, 28.5% from 45 to 64, and 17.5% 65 or older. The median age was 42 years. For every 100 females, there were 83.9 males. For every 100 females age 18 and over, there were 80.2 males.

The median household income was $57,031 and the median family income  was $67,500. Males had a median income of $40,625 versus $36,719 for females. The per capita income for the city was $26,235. About 1.8% of families and 1.3% of the population were below the poverty line, including 1.7% of those under age 18 and 5.8% of those age 65 or over.

References

External links
 

Cities in Jefferson County, Kentucky
Cities in Kentucky
Louisville metropolitan area